This article lists museums currently operating across the U.S. state of Florida, together with summaries of their locations and main focuses. There are additional lists of Florida's defunct and proposed museums.

Museums

Defunct museums
 Armed Forces History Museum, Largo, closed on January 29, 2017, displays included World War I, Japanese memorabilia associated with the World War II attack on Pearl Harbor, USMC in the South Pacific, D-Day landings, German Third Reich, Korean War and 8063rd M.A.S.H memorabilia.
 Burt Reynolds and Friends Museum, Jupiter
 Civil War Soldiers Museum, Pensacola 
 Children's Science Center  N. Ft. Myers. Closed in 2005.
 Cuban Museum of Arts and Culture, Miami
 Dinosaur Wildlife, Spring Hill, open from 1962 to 1998
 Dow Museum of Historic Houses, |St. Augustine, closed in 2014 and turned into a bed-and-breakfast complex
Florida International Museum at St. Petersburg College, St. Petersburg, closed in 2010 
 Florida Military Aviation Museum, St. Petersburg, closed in about 2007
 Flying Tigers Warbird Restoration Museum, Kissimmee, closed in 2004
 Fred Bear Museum, Gainesville, showcased archery & the contribution of Fred Bear, a man who popularized the sport, closed in 2003, current museum located in Springfield, Missouri
 Gulfcoast Wonder & Imagination Zone, The Hands-On Science Museum, Sarasota 
 Gulf Coast Museum of Art, Largo, closed January 2009, collection now part of Florida International Museum at St. Petersburg College
 Klassix Auto Attraction, Daytona Beach, closed in 2003
 Hibel Museum of Art, Jupiter
 Jacksonville Maritime Museum, Jacksonville, Florida, included large scale models of ships from the Mayflower to present day vessels, paintings, photographs and maritime artifacts
 Longboat Key Center for the Arts, closed in May 2017
 Mark K. Wheeler Gallery, Fort Lauderdale, Gallery of the former Art Institute of Fort Lauderdale
 Museum of the Sea and Indian, Destin, destroyed by hurricane in 1995
 Museum of Weapons & Early American History, St. Augustine
 Panama Canal Museum Florida, Seminole, closed in 2012, collections transferred to the George A. Smathers Libraries at the University of Florida in Gainesville 
 Skatelab, Atlantic Beach, closed in 2009, original store and museum in Simi Valley, California still open
 Teddy Bear Museum of Naples, Naples, closed in 2005
 Tom Gaskins Cypress Knee Museum, Palmdale, featured carved cypress knees, closed in 2000
 Tragedy in U.S. History Museum, St. Augustine, featured articles and memorabilia related to tragic events, closed in 1998
 Turtle Kraals Museum, Key West
 USS Requin, Tampa, now part of the Carnegie Science Center in Pittsburgh, Pennsylvania
 Welaka Maritime Museum, Welaka 
 Wings of Freedom Aviation Museum, Florida, Dunnellon 
 World Chess Hall of Fame and Sidney Samole Museum, moved to St. Louis, Missouri in 2011

Planned museums
 Bay of Pigs Museum, Miami
 Holocaust Documentation & Education Center, Dania Beach
 John H. Fetterman Maritime Museum and Research Center, Pensacola, website
 Mark X. and E. Louise Benson Museum, Gulf Breeze, website
 Pulse Memorial and Museum, Orlando

See also
Nature Centers in Florida

References
Florida's Museums and Cultural Attractions (Second Edition) - by Doris Bardon and Murray Laurie

External links

Florida Association of Museums

Florida

Museums
Museums